Dali Qiz (also Romanized as Dalī Qez; also known as Dalīqez) is a village in Garmeh-ye Shomali Rural District, Kandovan District, Meyaneh County, East Azerbaijan Province, Iran. At the 2006 census, its population was 286, in 60 families.

References 

Populated places in Meyaneh County